Roscoff is a commune in the Finistère département of Brittany in northwestern France.

Roscoff is renowned for its picturesque architecture, labelled  (small town of character) since 2009. Roscoff is also a traditional departure point for Onion Johnnies.

After lobbying by local economic leaders headed by Alexis Gourvennec, the French government agreed in 1968 to provide a deep-water port at Roscoff. Existing ferry operators were reluctant to take on the relatively long Plymouth–Roscoff crossing so Gourvennec and colleagues founded Brittany Ferries. Since the early 1970s Roscoff has been developed as a ferry port for the transport of Breton agricultural produce and for motor tourism. Brittany Ferries link Roscoff with both Ireland and the United Kingdom.

A French doctor, Louis-Eugène Bagot, opened the Institut Marin in Roscoff in 1899, the first centre for thalassotherapy in Europe. Since then many important centres of thalassotherapy such as the Institut de Rockroum (originally Institut marin), the clinic Kerléna and a heliomarin hospital founded in 1900, the Perharidy Centre, can be found by the sea at Roscoff.

The nearby Île de Batz, called  in Breton, is a small island that can be reached by launch from the harbour.

Sights
 Roscoff parish church Our Lady of Croaz Batz (Notre Dame de Croaz Batz): Renaissance and Gothic church from the 16th century
 The house known as "that of Mary, Queen of Scots"
 The Station Biologique de Roscoff, a research laboratory in oceanography and marine biology
 The Jardin Exotique de Roscoff

 The Onion Johnny museum

Population
Inhabitants of Roscoff are called in French Roscovites.

Breton language
The municipality launched a language plan through Ya d'ar brezhoneg on 14 November 2008.

In 2008 18.44% of primary-school children attended bilingual schools.

Ferries
Brittany Ferries operate ferry services from Roscoff to Plymouth daily from February to November with occasional Christmas sailings, to Cork twice a week (Friday and Tuesday service).

Irish Ferries used to operate a ferry service from Roscoff to Rosslare from May to September but now sail to Cherbourg instead.

Historic events
 In 1375 the harbour was destroyed by English forces under the Earl of Arundel. It would later be rebuilt at its current location, Kroas Batz.
 From 1522 to 1545–1550 the construction the Church of Our Lady of Kroas Batz (see Monuments above).
 In 1548 the six-year-old Mary, Queen of Scots, having been betrothed to the Dauphin François, disembarked at Roscoff en route from Scotland.
 In 1790 Roscoff was raised to independent commune. Until then the town had effectively depended on Saint-Pol-de-Léon.
 The illustrator Henry Gerbault and his wife moved to Roscoff in 1919 and lived there for  the rest of their lives.

International relations

Roscoff is twinned with:
 Great Torrington, United Kingdom
 Auxerre, France

Image gallery

See also
Communes of the Finistère department

References

External links

The commune's website
Tourism office
Daily life in Roscoff
Jardin exotique de Roscoff (Roscoff exotic garden) 
 Cultural Heritage 
The Perharidy point diving centre's official website
Bernard Beaulien Painter 
Tripping diary 
Station Biologique de Roscoff 
Port of Roscoff 

Communes of Finistère
Port cities and towns on the French Atlantic coast
Ports and harbours of the English Channel